Rashid Pur Altabari is a village in Bahadurganj, Kishanganj district, Bihar, India.

Location 
Rashid Pur Altabari is located on the Janta-Lohagara (T02) road. The village is about 20 km far from the district headquarter in north-west direction. The nearest city is Bahadurganj which is almost 13 km far. Bahadurganj is also block headquarter of the village. The village comes under Altabari panchayat.

Famous residents 

 Md Manavvar Hussain, Religious leader, Educationist, founder of Darul Uloom Bahadurganj
 Qari Salim, director of Madarsa Hussainia furquania Rashid Pur Altabari
 Md Anwar Alam, director Darul Uloom Bahadurganj

References  

Villages in Kishanganj district